Bigg Boss 3 is the third season of the Telugu-language version of the Indian reality television series Bigg Boss.. It premiered on 21 July 2019 on Star Maa. Nagarjuna was the host of the season. Ramya Krishnan was guest host for Week 6 instead of Nagarjuna who was then in Spain for celebrating his 60th birthday.

The season concluded on 3 November 2019 after 105 days with Rahul Sipligunj winning the title along with  prize money while Sreemukhi emerged as the first runner-up.

Production

Bigg Boss 3 Buzzz
Bigg Boss 3 Buzzz is an Indian Telugu-language Television talk show about the reality television series Bigg Boss Telugu. The host Tanish conducts the talk show with the evicted contestants of Bigg Boss 3 on every Monday, the show premiered on 22 July 2019 onwards on Star Maa Music. The unseen portions of episodes that were not aired on television are streamed on Disney+ Hotstar and aired on Star Maa Music as Bigg Boss 3 Buzzz.

Reception
The launch of season 3 opened with 17.9 TVR, which is bigger than the previous seasons. The grand finale of season 3 of duration four and half hours scored 18.29 TVR being the highest ever rating achieved by the Bigg Boss Indian franchise. The last hour of telecast, featuring Chiranjeevi as chief guest, alone garnered 22.4 TVR.

Bigg Boss 3 Voting Process
As the Bigg Boss 3 Telugu vote online process has been started, viewers can vote for their favorite contestant through Disney+ Hotstar or by giving a missed call.

Housemates status

Housemates
The participants in the order of appearance and entered in house are:

Original entrants
 Shiva Jyothi – Presenter.
 Ravi Krishna – Television actor.
 Ashu Reddy – Internet celebrity.
 Jaffar – Journalist.
 Himaja – Actress.
 Rahul Sipligunj – Singer.
 Rohini Reddy – Television Actress.
 Baba Bhaskar – Choreographer & Director. 
 Punarnavi Bhupalam – Actress.
 Hema Vani – Actress.
 Ali Reza – Actor & model.
 Mahesh Vitta – Actor.
 Sreemukhi – Actress & Television presenter.
 Varun Sandesh – Film actor
 Vithika Sheru –Actress.

Wild Card entrants
 Tamanna Simhadhri – Actress and activist
 Shilpa Chakravarthy – Television presenter.

References

2019 Indian television seasons
03